Catholic Herald is a London-based Roman Catholic monthly newspaper and magazine.

Catholic Herald may also refer to:

 The Arlington Catholic Herald, of the Roman Catholic Diocese of Arlington
Catholic News Herald, of the Roman Catholic Diocese of Charlotte
Hawaii Catholic Herald, of the Roman Catholic Diocese of Honolulu
The Superior Catholic Herald, of the Roman Catholic Diocese of Superior

See also
Herald Malaysia, a Catholic newspaper in Malaysia